Arriving is a 2004 album by Chris Tomlin.

Arriving may also refer to:

 Arriving (Loose Tubes album), a 2015 English jazz ensemble album
 "Arriving", a song by Harold Budd and John Foxx from Translucence/Drift Music, 2003
 "Arriving", a song by Evelyn Glennie from Touch the Sound, 2004

See also
Arrive (disambiguation)
Arrival (disambiguation)